John Howard Smith is an American mathematician and retired professor of mathematics at Boston College. He received his Ph.D. from the Massachusetts Institute of Technology in 1963, under the supervision of Kenkichi Iwasawa.
In voting theory, he is known for the Smith set, the smallest nonempty set of candidates such that, in every pairwise matchup (two-candidate election/runoff) between a member and a non-member, the member is the winner by majority rule, and for the Smith criterion, a property of certain election systems in which the winner is guaranteed to belong to the Smith set. He has also made contributions to spectral graph theory and additive number theory.

References

Year of birth missing (living people)
Living people
20th-century American mathematicians
21st-century American mathematicians
Voting theorists
Graph theorists
Number theorists
Massachusetts Institute of Technology School of Science alumni
Boston College faculty